The Georgetown Tigers football program represents Georgetown College of Georgetown, Kentucky in college football.  The Tigers have been one of the most successful football teams playing NAIA.

Accomplishments
 National Champions – 1991, 2000, 2001
 National Finalist – 1991, 1999, 2000, 2001, 2002
 National Semi-Finalist – 2004, 2011
 19 Mid-South Conference Champions – 1987, 1989, 1990, 1991, 1992, 1993, 1998, 1999, 2000, 2001, 2002, 2003, 2004, 2005, 2006, 2010, 2011, 2012, 2015
 NAIA National Coach of the Year – Bill Cronin – 2000, 2001

History
The team had rivalries with both Kentucky and Transylvania going back to the 19th century.

The Kevin Donley era
Kevin Donley has been one of the most successful coaches in NAIA football.  Donley joined the Georgetown College staff as head coach in 1982.  The high point of his career here came in 1991 when the Tigers went 13–1 (.929) and won the NAIA Division II National Football Championship.  In the 14 games played that season, the Tigers scored 744 points, among the most of all college football teams at all levels of play.  For his team's achievements, Donley was named the NAIA National Coach of the Year.

Following is a game-by-game recap of the Kevin Donley era:

1982
(2–9 overall, 1–6 conference)

1983
(7–3 overall, 2–3 conference)

1984
(4–6 overall, 0–2 conference)

1985
(4–6 overall, 1–2 conference)

1986
(6–4 overall, 1–2 conference)

1987
(8–3 overall, 4–2 conference)

1988
(7–3 overall, 4–1 conference)

1989
(7–3–1 overall, 5–0 conference)

1990
(9–2 overall, 4–0 conference)

1991
(13–1 overall, 6–0 conference)

1992
(8–3 overall, 4–1 conference)

Other notable years

2001

The Kentucky State Senate honored the 2001 team.

References

External links
 

 
American football teams established in 1893
1893 establishments in Kentucky